Topley may refer to:

Surname:
Don Topley (born 1964), former English cricketer
Lady Sophia Topley (born 1957), daughter of the 11th Duke of Devonshire
Martina Topley-Bird, British vocalist
Peter Topley (born 1950), former English cricketer
Reece Topley (born 1994), English cricketer
William James Topley (1845–1930), Canadian photographer based in Ottawa, Ontario
William Topley (geologist) FRS (1841–1894), British geologist
William Topley (musician), British musician
William Whiteman Carlton Topley FRS (1886–1944), British bacteriologist

Places:
Topley, British Columbia, small town in northern British Columbia, located on the Trans-Canada highway
Topley Landing Provincial Park, provincial park in British Columbia, Canada
Topley Landing, British Columbia, small town near the provincial park